Nesrine Daoula (born 9 April 1990) is a Tunisian team handball player. She plays on the Tunisian national team, and participated at the 2011 World Women's Handball Championship in Brazil.

References

1990 births
Living people
Tunisian female handball players